The Mimbreños were a part of the Native American Apache tribe. They were located in present day New Mexico in the narrow valley of the Mimbres River. The band at this location were known as the Tchihende band; another band was affiliated with the Chiricahua.

Culture and architecture 
Mimbrenos were creative in their artwork and often worked in adobe. They created intricate pottery from this and would decorate it. They would make bowls and use them in burials as well. For the pottery they also had different color schemes to represent different things. Stone was another important tool they used to create weapons. Often they would create axes, hammers, and spades all from stone. Clay and metal also were materials used; clay tablets were used to inscribe messages or even create game boards. Bones from the animals they hunted were used as decoration around their home or fashioned as weapons. 

Their houses were mostly made out of adobe and stone. They would level off the ground and build the walls up around the ground from which they leveled. Their houses were usually in groups near the river. Their adobe houses are also known as Pueblo. The roofs of the house were typically something heavy like metal. They also contained fireplaces in the middle which would be dug out from the floor and contented stone or adobe.

Many scholars view Mimbreño's and their culture to be overall peaceful and defensive towards war and destruction. It appears that they would take part in leisure activities to fill their extra time like pottery and art versus war.

Religion 
Mimbreños celebrated burials and would commonly place the deceased in a seated position. Notable people would be buried with utensils to take with them into the next life. Decorated bowls would often be buried with the dead. The Mimbrenos believed that what they placed with the dead would be carried with them into the afterlife for them to use. 

The designs on the pottery the Mimbreños created is assumed to represent their religious beliefs. Since there are many different designs, scholars are able to predict what they saw as important. Some of their pottery had intricate geometric shapes which led scholars to believe that they held a strong importance with emotion. Zoomorphic decorations were popular designs.

Innovations 
The Mimbrenos developed their own irrigation system. This irrigation system made it possible for the Mimbrenos to stay in one place. This is different to other tribes that would have to be more nomadic because they needed to find different food sources. In the end however, the irrigation system failed because it is believed that they did not sufficiently use the Mimbres River as they developed their agricultural society.

References 

Apache people